Yolande II or Yolande of Nevers, (December 1247 – 2 June 1280) was ruling Countess of Nevers between 1262 and 1280.

Life
She was the daughter of Odo of Burgundy, and Matilda II, Countess of Nevers.

On the death of her mother in 1262, Yolande, became the titular countess of Nevers, Tonnerre and Auxerre. However, in 1273 the arbitrators at the Parlement de Paris decided that the inheritance would be split among the sisters: Yolande got Nevers and the Château de Druyes, while her sisters Margaret and Adelaide inherited Tonnerre and Auxerre, respectively.  Their aunt Agnes received the Bourbon fiefs. Upon the death of her paternal grandfather, Hugh IV, Duke of Burgundy, in 1272, after their marriage in Auxerre the same year, Yolande and her influential second husband, Robert III, Count of Flanders, claimed the Duchy of Burgundy on the basis of primogeniture, being the first-born child of Hugh's deceased eldest son. Hugh IV, however, in his will named his third son, Robert, as heir to the Duchy while giving other fiefs to his granddaughters. King Philip III of France, one of the arbitrators, decided in favor of her uncle, who thus became Duke Robert II, on the basis of proximity of blood.

Her first marriage was to John Tristan, Count of Valois, son of Louis IX of France and Margaret of Provence, in June 1265; they had no children, and he died of dysentery in 1270 at Tunis while on the Eighth Crusade.

Issue
Yolande's children with Robert III, Count of Flanders, were:

 Louis I (1272–1322), Count of Nevers and of Réthel. His son was Louis I, Count of Flanders
 Robert (d. 1331), Seigneur of Marle and of Cassel, married (1323) Joan of Brittany (1294–1364), daughter of Arthur II of Brittany, and Yolande, countess of Montfort, producing:
 John, Seigneur of Cassel (d. 1332)
 Yolande (1331–1395), married Henry IV of Bar.
 Joan (d. 1333), married in 1288 Enguerrand IV of Coucy (d. 1310), Seigneur of Coucy and Viscount of Meaux
 Yolande (d. 1313), married in about 1287 Wautier II of Enghien (d. 1309)
 Matilda, married about 1314 in Matthieu of Lorraine (d. 1330), lord of Warsberg

Notes

References
 Chronique ou histoire abrégée des évêques et des comtes de Nevers écrite en Latin au seizième siècle et publiée pour la première fois Texte imprimé]par René de Lespinasse,..1870; Le Nivernais et les comtes de Nevers... par René de Lespinasse,.Paris : H. Champion, 1909 (-1914)

1247 births
1280 deaths
13th-century women rulers
Counts of Nevers
House of Burgundy
House of Dampierre
13th-century French people
13th-century French women